The 1992 United States presidential election in Hawaii took place on November 3, 1992, as part of the 1992 United States presidential election. Voters chose four representatives, or electors to the Electoral College, who voted for president and vice president.

Hawaii was won by Governor Bill Clinton (D-Arkansas) with 48.09% of the popular vote over incumbent President George H. W. Bush (R-Texas) with 36.70%. Businessman Ross Perot (I-Texas) finished in third, with 14.22% of the popular vote, which was nonetheless Perot’s poorest showing outside the District of Columbia and antebellum slave states. Clinton ultimately won the national vote, defeating incumbent President Bush. Clinton comfortably won Hawaii by a margin of 11.39%. It has only voted Republican twice since its statehood, in the 49-state Republican landslides of 1972 and 1984. From 1988 forward it has consistently voted Democratic by comfortable margins.

Results

By county

References

Hawaii
1992
1992 Hawaii elections